The 1960 Arizona State Sun Devils football team was an American football team that represented Arizona State University in the Border Conference during the 1960 NCAA University Division football season. In their third season under head coach Frank Kush, the Sun Devils compiled a 7–3 record (3–2 against Border opponents) and outscored their opponents by a combined total of 223 to 120.

The team's statistical leaders included Ron Cosner with 422 passing yards, Nolan Jones with 582 rushing yards, and Bob Rembert with 178 receiving yards.

Schedule

References

Arizona State
Arizona State Sun Devils football seasons
Arizona State Sun Devils football